is a Japanese actress and singer.

Biography
After passing the audition for the film produced by Haruki Kadokawa, she began her acting career. Along with teen idols Tomoyo Harada and Noriko Watanabe who debuted from Kadokawa Haruki Corporation, she was often dubbed as one of "Kadokawa Sannin-musume" in her early career.

Yakushimaru made her acting debut in the 1978 movie Never Give Up. In 1981, she came into prominence with Sailor Suit and Machine Gun, the film where she played the leading role. She also recorded the same-titled theme song for the film, which hit No. 1 on Oricon in late 1981 and stayed there until January 18, 1982.

Since rising to fame, Yakushimaru has gained success as both an actress and a pop singer, mainly during the 1980s. She had also worked as a prolific recording artist until her marriage with Kōji Tamaki, the leader of the band Anzen Chitai. According to the Japanese Oricon chart, combined sales of her singles and albums have been estimated approximately 5.9 million copies to date.

Filmography

Film

Television

Discography

Studio albums

Compilation albums

Singles

References

External links
  at Victor Entertainment 

1964 births
Living people
Japanese film actresses
Japanese women pop singers
Japanese television actresses
Singers from Tokyo
20th-century Japanese actresses
21st-century Japanese actresses
20th-century Japanese women singers
20th-century Japanese singers
21st-century Japanese women singers
21st-century Japanese singers